Urea transporter 2 is a protein that in humans is encoded by the SLC14A2 gene.

Function 

In mammalian cells, urea is the chief end-product of nitrogen catabolism and plays an important role in the urinary concentration mechanism. Thus, the plasma membrane of erythrocytes and some renal epithelial cells exhibit an elevated urea permeability that is mediated by highly selective urea transporters. In mammals, two urea transporters have been identified: the renal tubular urea transporter, UT2 (UT-A), and the erythrocyte urea transporter, UT11 (also called UT-B, coded for by the SLC14A1 gene). SLC14A2 and SLC14A1 constitute solute carrier family 14.

References

Further reading

Solute carrier family